Warli painting is a form of tribal art mostly created by the tribal people from the North Sahyadri Range in Maharashtra, India. This range encompasses cities such as Dahanu, Talasari, Jawhar, Palghar, Mokhada, and Vikramgad of Palghar district. This tribal art was originated in Maharashtra, where it is still practiced today.

Tradition
The Warli Painting tradition in Maharashtra are among the finest examples of the folk style of paintings.  The Warli tribe is one of the largest in India, located outside Mumbai . Til the 1970s, even though the tribal style of art is thought to date back as early as 10th century A.D. The Warli culture is centered on the concept of Mother Nature and elements of nature are often focal points depicted in Warli painting. Farming is their main way of life and a large source of food for the tribe. They greatly respect nature and wildlife for the resources that they provide for life. Warli artists use their clay huts as the backdrop for their paintings, similar to how ancient people used cave walls as their canvases.

Jivya Soma Mashe, the artist in Thane district has played a great role in making the Warli paintings more popular.

Painting technique

These rudimentary wall paintings use a set of basic geometric shapes: a circle, a triangle, and a square. These shapes are symbolic of different elements of nature. The circle and the triangle come from their observation of nature. The circle represents the sun and the moon, while the triangle depicts mountains and conical trees. In contrast, the square renders to be a human invention, indicating a sacred enclosure or a piece of land. The central motif in each ritual painting is the square, known as the "chauk" or "chaukat", mostly of two types known as Devchauk and Lagnachauk. Inside a Devchauk is usually a depiction of palghat, the mother goddess, symbolizing fraternity.

Male gods are unusual among the Warli and are frequently related to spirits which have taken human shape. The central motif in the ritual painting is surrounded by scenes portraying hunting, fishing, and farming, and trees and animals. Festivals and dances are common scenes depicted in the ritual paintings. People and animals are represented by two inverse triangles joined at their tips: the upper triangle depicts the torso and the lower triangle the pelvis. Their precarious equilibrium symbolizes the balance of the universe. The representation also has the practical and amusing advantage of animating the bodies. Another main theme of Warli art is the denotation of a triangle that is larger at the top, representing a man; and a triangle which is wider at the bottom, representing a woman. Apart from ritualistic paintings, other Warli paintings covered day-to-day activities of the village people.

One of the central aspects depicted in many Warli paintings is the tarpa dance.  The tarpa, a trumpet-like instrument, is played in turns by different village men. Men and women entwine their hands and move in a circle around the tarpa player. The dancers then follow him, turning and moving as he turns, never turning their backs to the tarpa. The musician plays two different notes, which direct the head dancer to either move clockwise or counterclockwise. The tarpa player assumes a role similar to that of a snake charmer, and the dancers become the figurative snake. The dancers take a long turn in the audience and try to encircle them for entertainment. The circle formation of the dancers is also said to resemble the circle of life.

Materials used
The simple pictorial language of Warli painting is matched by a rudimentary technique. The ritual paintings are usually created on the inside walls of village huts. The walls are made of a mixture of branches, earth and red brick that make a red ochre background for the paintings. The Warli only paint with a white pigment made from a mixture of rice flour and water, with gum as a binder. A bamboo stick is chewed at the end to give it the texture of a paintbrush. Walls are painted only to mark special occasions such as weddings, festivals or every thing harvests. They make it with a sense that it can be seen by future generations.

In contemporary culture

The lack of regular artistic activity explains the traditional tribal sense of style for their paintings. In the 1970s, this ritual art took a radical turn when Jivya Soma Mashe and his son Balu Mashe started to paint. They painted not for ritual purposes, but because of their artistic pursuits. Jivya is known as the modern father of Warli painting. Since the 1970s, Warli painting has moved onto paper and canvas.

Coca-Cola India launched a campaign featuring Warli painting in order to highlight the ancient culture and represent a sense of togetherness. The campaign was called "Come Home on Deepawali" and specifically targeted the modern youth. The campaign included advertising on traditional mass media, combined with radio, the Internet, and out-of-home media.

The Manik Public School at Maniknagar, Karnataka, dedicated a large wall of their academic block to preserve Indian heritage by hosting India's largest Warli art painting. Famous Warli artist Avanti Sandeep Kulkarni designed and hand-painted the school's vision, values, and activities using the Warli culture and themes. Sections of painting were dedicated to showcasing Warli traditions. The India Book of Records recognized the record.

Traditional knowledge and intellectual property
Warli Painting is traditional knowledge and cultural intellectual property preserved across generations. Understanding the urgent need for intellectual property rights, the tribal non-governmental organization Adivasi Yuva Seva Sangh helped to register Warli painting with a geographical indication under the intellectual property rights act. Various efforts are in progress for strengthening sustainable economy of the Warli with social entrepreneurship.

References

External links

 Warli Artist Avanti Sandeep Kulkarni from Pune sets a record for largest Warli Art Wall Painting (58 ft x 30 ft.) at The Manik Public School, Maniknagar
 Warli Painting by Tribals
 Warli Painting Home Page by Tribals
 About Warli painting
 Artist Shruti from Mumbai Made 200+ Warli Painting in 20 Hours set a New Record with World Records India
 Tanvee desai

Geographical indications in Maharashtra
Indian painting
Palghar district
Schools of Indian painting